is a Japanese director of anime.

Works

Anime television series
Yugo the Negotiator: Pakistan Chapter (2004) - Director
Ragnarok the Animation (2004) - Director, Storyboard
Magikano (2006) - Director, Storyboard
Galaxy Angel II (2006) - Director
My Bride Is a Mermaid (2007) - Director
Astro Fighter Sunred (2008–09) - Director
Astro Fighter Sunred 2 (2009–10) - Chief Director, Storyboard
Angel Beats! (2010) - Director, Storyboard
Kamisama Dolls (2011) - Director
Persona 4: The Animation (2011) - Director
Humanity Has Declined (2012) - Director
Devil Survivor 2: The Animation (2013) - Director
Danganronpa: The Animation (2013) - Director
Arpeggio of Blue Steel (2013) - Director
Hamatora: The Animation (2014) - Chief Director
Re:_Hamatora (2014) - Director
Persona 4: The Golden Animation (2014) - Chief Director
Yuki Yuna is a Hero (2014) - Director
Assassination Classroom (2015) - Director
Rampo Kitan: Game of Laplace (2015) - Director
Assassination Classroom: Second Season (2016) - Director
Danganronpa 3: The End of Hope's Peak High School (2016) - Chief Director
Tsuki ga Kirei (2017) - Director
Classroom of the Elite (2017) - Director
Yuki Yuna is a Hero: Washio Sumi Chapter (2017) - Chief Director
Yuki Yuna is a Hero: Hero Chapter (2017) - Chief Director
Asobi Asobase (2018) - Director
Radiant (2018–20) - Director
Kengan Ashura (2019) - Director
With a Dog AND a Cat, Every Day is Fun (2020) - Director, Series Composition
Yuki Yuna is a Hero: The Great Mankai Chapter (2021) - Director
Classroom of the Elite 2nd Season (2022) - Chief Director
Ao no Orchestra (2023) - Director

Original video animation
My Bride Is a Mermaid OVA (2008–09) - Director
Carnival Phantasm (2011) - Director
Fate/Grand Carnival (2021) - Director

Anime film
Aura: Koga Maryuin's Last War (2013) - Director
Persona 3 The Movie: No. 1, Spring of Birth (2013) - Supervisor
Persona 3 The Movie: No. 2, Midsummer Knight's Dream (2014) - Supervisor
Persona 3 The Movie: No. 3, Falling Down (2015) - Supervisor
Persona 3 The Movie: No. 4, Winter of Rebirth (2016) - Supervisor

Video games
Danganronpa Another Episode: Ultra Despair Girls (2014) - Director (animated cutscenes)

Awards

In 2014, The 19th Animation Kobe committee chose him to receive their Individual Award for the stretch of his career including Danganronpa: The Animation, Arpeggio of Blue Steel, and Hamatora. In his writeup explaining the committee's choice, Toshiya Matsushita of Animage cited his impressive annual volume of work and his work on Arpeggio of Blue Steel, a fully 3DCG anime, in particular.

References

Bibliography

External links

チームティルドーン
チームティルドーン公式ブログ

Anime directors
Living people
Japanese storyboard artists
Japanese voice directors
Year of birth missing (living people)
Place of birth missing (living people)